Francis Miller may refer to:

Francis Norie-Miller (1859–1947), British insurance company manager and later Liberal National politician
Francis Pickens Miller (1895–1978), American military and intelligence officer and Virginia politician
Francis Trevelyan Miller (1877–1959), American writer and film-maker
Francis Spurstow Miller (1863–1954), Royal Navy officer
Francis T. Miller, American farmer and politician from New York
F. Russell Miller, New Zealand politician

See also
Frank Miller (disambiguation)